Pemberton Hall may refer to:

Pemberton Hall (Eastern Illinois University), Charleston, Illinois
Pemberton Hall (Salisbury, Maryland)

See also
Pemberton House (disambiguation)

Architectural disambiguation pages